Jade Wilcoxson (born April 17, 1978) is an American racing cyclist. She competed in the 2013 UCI women's road race in Florence.

Major results
2013
1st  National Road Race Championships
5th National Time Trial Championships
3rd Team Pursuit, Los Angeles Grand Prix (with Cari Higgins, Elizabeth Newell and Lauren Tamayo)
2014
5th National Time Trial Championships

References

External links
 
 USA Cycling News

1978 births
Living people
American female cyclists
People from Visalia, California
Cyclists from California
21st-century American women